

Match results

Friendlies

Liga I

League table

Results by round

Results summary

Matches

Cupa României

Players

Squad statistics

Transfers

In

Out

Club

Coaching staff

Kit

|
|

References

See also

2009-10
Romanian football clubs 2009–10 season